The 42nd Cannes Film Festival was held from 11 to 23 May 1989. The Palme d'Or went to Sex, Lies, and Videotape by Steven Soderbergh.

The festival opened with New York Stories, anthology film directed by Woody Allen, Francis Ford Coppola, Martin Scorsese and closed with Old Gringo, directed by Luis Puenzo.

During the 1989 festival, the first Cinéma & liberté forum was held with the participation of a hundred famous directors from various countries. They discussed about the freedom of expression and signed a declaration protesting against all forms of censorship still existing in the world.

Juries

Main competition
The following people were appointed as the Jury of the 1989 feature film competition:
Wim Wenders Jury President
Christine Gouze-Rénal
Claude Beylie
Georges Delerue
Hector Babenco
Krzysztof Kieślowski
Peter Handke
Renée Blanchar
Sally Field
Silvio Clementelli

Camera d'Or
The following people were appointed as the Jury of the 1989 Camera d'Or:
Raf Vallone (actor) president
Bernard Jubard
Klaus Eder (journalist)
Moustafa Salah  Hashem (Critic)
Peter Scarlet (cinephile)
Philippe Maarek (critic)
Suzanne Schiffman (screenwriter)
Yvan Gauthier (cinephile)

Official selection

In competition - Feature film
The following feature films competed for the Palme d'Or:

 Black Rain (Kuroi ame) by Shohei Imamura
 Chimère by Claire Devers
 Cinema Paradiso (Nuovo cinema Paradiso) by Giuseppe Tornatore
 Do the Right Thing by Spike Lee
 Evil Angels (A Cry in the Dark) by Fred Schepisi
 Francesco by Liliana Cavani
 Jesus of Montreal (Jésus de Montréal) by Denys Arcand
 Kuarup by Ruy Guerra
 Lost Angels by Hugh Hudson
 Monsieur Hire by Patrice Leconte
 Moon Child (El niño de la luna) by Agustí Villaronga
 Mystery Train by Jim Jarmusch
 Reunion by Jerry Schatzberg
 Rosalie Goes Shopping by Percy Adlon
 Sex, Lies, and Videotape by Steven Soderbergh
 Spider's Web (Das Spinnennetz) by Bernhard Wicki
 Splendor by Ettore Scola
 Sweetie by Jane Campion
 Time of the Gypsies (Dom za vešanje) by Emir Kusturica
 Too Beautiful for You (Trop belle pour toi) by Bertrand Blier
 Torrents of Spring by Jerzy Skolimowski
 The Women on the Roof (Kvinnorna på taket) by Carl-Gustav Nykvist

Un Certain Regard
The following films were selected for the competition of Un Certain Regard:

 Black Sin (Schwarze Sünde) by Jean-Marie Straub, Danièle Huillet
 Devět kruhů pekla by Milan Muchna
 Barroco by Paul Leduc
 Errors of Youth (Oshibki yunosti) by Boris Frumin
 Fool's Mate (Zugzwang) by Mathieu Carrière
 Golden Horseshoes (Safa'ih min dhahab) by Nouri Bouzid
 Malpractice by Bill Bennett
 My 20th Century (Én XX. századom, Az) by Ildikó Enyedi
 Piravi by Shaji N. Karun
 The Prisoner of St. Petersburg by Ian Pringle
 Santa Sangre by Alejandro Jodorowsky
 The Tenth One in Hiding (Il decimo clandestino) by Lina Wertmüller
 Thick Skinned (Peaux de vaches) by Patricia Mazuy
 Treffen in Travers by Michael Gwisdek
 Venus Peter by Ian Sellar
 Voices of Sarafina! by Nigel Noble
 Whirlwind (Smertch) by Bako Sadykov
 Why Has Bodhi-Dharma Left for the East? (Dalmaga dongjjok-euro gan kkadakeun?) by Bae Yong-Kyun
 Wired by Larry Peerce

Films out of competition
The following films were selected to be screened out of competition.

 New York Stories by Woody Allen, Francis Ford Coppola, Martin Scorsese
 Old Gringo by Luis Puenzo

Special screenings

 1001 films by André Delvaux
 50 ans by Gilles Carle
 Fight for Us (Orapronobis) by Lino Brocka
 Ganashatru by Satyajit Ray
 Lawrence of Arabia by David Lean
 Liberté by Laurent Jacob
 The Monkey Folk (Le peuple singe) by Gérard Vienne
 Scandal by Michael Caton-Jones

Short film competition
The following short films competed for the Palme d'Or du court métrage:

 Beau Fixe Sur Cormeilles by Gilles Lacombe
 Blind Alley by Emmanuel Salinger
 Full Metal Racket by William Nunez
 The Gest of Segu (Segu janjo) by Mambaye Coulibaly
 Kitchen Sink by Alison Maclean
 Manly Games (Muzné hry) by Jan Svankmajer
 Performance Pieces (Morceaux Choisis) by Tom Abrams
 The Persistent Peddler (Le Colporteur) by Claude Cloutier
 Le Théâtre du Père Carlo by Rao Kheidmets
 Yes We Can by Faith Hubley

Parallel sections

International Critics' Week
The following feature films were screened for the 28th International Critics' Week (28e Semaine de la Critique):

Feature film competition

 Rose of the Desert (Rose des Sables) by Mohamed Rachid Benhadj (Algeria)
 Tjoet Nja’ Dhien by Eros Djarot (Indonesia)
 As Tears Go By by Wong Kar-wai (Hong Kong)
 Waller's Last Trip (Wallers letzter Gang) by Christian Wagner (West Germany)
 Arab by Fadhel Jaibi and Fadhel Jaziri (Tunisia)
 La Ville de Yun by U-Sun Kim (Japan)
 Les Poissons morts (Die toten Fische) by Michael Synek (Austria)
 Montalvo et l’enfant by Claude Mourieras (France)
 Black Square (Chyornyy kvadrat) by Iosif Pasternak (Soviet Union)
 Duende by Jean-Blaise Junod (Switzerland)

Short film competition

 Warszawa Koluszki by Jerzy Zalewski (Poland)
 Le Porte plume by Marie-Christine Perrodin (France)
 Blind Curve by Gary Markowitz (United States)
 The Three Soldiers by Kamal Musale (Switzerland)
 Work Experience by James Hendrie (United Kingdom)
 Der Mensch mit den modernen Nerven by Bady Minck (Austria/Luxembourg)
 Trombone en coulisses by Hubert Toint (Belgium, France)
 Wstega mobiusa by Lukasz Karwowski (Poland)
 La Femme mariée de Nam Xuong by Tran Anh Hung (France)

Directors' Fortnight
The following feature films were screened for the 1989 Directors' Fortnight (Quinzaine des Réalizateurs):

 Caracas by Michael Schottenberg
 Der 7. Kontinent by Michael Haneke
  by Rudolf Thome
 Eat a Bowl Of Tea by Wayne Wang
 El Rio que nos Lleva by Antonio del Real
 Zerograd by Karen Shakhnazarov
 Il piccolo diavolo by Roberto Benigni
 Maria Von Den Sternen by Thomas Mauch
  by 
 Niu Peng by Dai Sijie
 Piccoli Equivoci by Ricky Tognazzi
 Sidewalk Stories by Charles Lane
 Sis by Zülfü Livaneli
 Speaking Parts by Atom Egoyan
 Yaaba by Idrissa Ouedraogo

Awards

Official awards
The following films and people received the 1989 awards:
Palme d'Or: Sex, Lies, and Videotape by Steven Soderbergh
Grand Prix:
 Nuovo cinema Paradiso by Giuseppe Tornatore
 Trop belle pour toi by Bertrand Blier
Best Director: Emir Kusturica for Dom za vešanje
Best Actress: Meryl Streep for Evil Angels
Best Actor: James Spader for Sex, Lies, and Videotape
Best Artistic Contribution: Jim Jarmusch for Mystery Train
Jury Prize: Jésus de Montréal by Denys Arcand
Golden Camera
Caméra d'Or: My 20th Century (Én XX. századom, Az) by Ildikó Enyedi
Golden Camera - Special Mention: Piravi by Shaji N. Karun & Waller's Last Trip by Christian Wagner
Short films
Short Film Palme d'Or: 50 ans by Gilles Carle (Out of competition)
Special Mention - Best Short Film: Performance Pieces by Tom Abrams & Yes We Can by Faith Hubley

Independent awards
FIPRESCI Prizes
 Sex, Lies, and Videotape by Steven Soderbergh (In competition)
 Yaaba by Idrissa Ouedraogo (Directors' Fortnight)
Commission Supérieure Technique
 Technical Grand Prize: Kuroi ame by Shōhei Imamura
Ecumenical Jury
 Prize of the Ecumenical Jury: Jésus de Montréal by Denys Arcand
 Ecumenical Jury - Special Mention: Kuroi ame by Shōhei Imamura & Yaaba by Idrissa Ouedraogo
Award of the Youth
Foreign Film: Caracas by Michael Schottenberg
Other awards
Special Award: Gregory Peck

References

Media
INA: Climbing of the steps for the opening of the 1989 festival (commentary in French)
INA: Assessment of and reactions to the list of winners of the 1989 Festival (commentary in French)

External links

1989 Cannes Film Festival (web.archive)
Official website Retrospective 1989
Cannes Film Festival Awards for 1989 at Internet Movie Database

Cannes Film Festival
Cannes Film Festival
Cannes Film Festival
Cannes